Finland women's national floorball team is the national team of Finland. At the 1997 Floorball Women's World Championship in Godby and Mariehamn, Åland, Finland, the team finished second. At the 1999 Floorball Women's World Championship in Borlänge, Sweden, the team finished first in the A-Division. At the 2001 Floorball Women's World Championship in Riga, Latvia, the team finished first in the A-Division. At the 2003 Floorball Women's World Championship in Germany, the team finished third in the A-Division. At the 2005 Floorball Women's World Championship in Singapore, the team finished second in the A-Division. At the 2007 Floorball Women's World Championship in Frederikshavn, Denmark, the team finished third in the A-Division.

Medal record

All-time world championships results

References 

Women's national floorball teams
Floorball
National team